Tiago Alexandre Carvalho Gonçalves (born 28 December 1988), commonly known as Ronaldo, is a Portuguese professional footballer who plays for Pevidém S.C. as a midfielder.

Club career
Born in Loures, Lisbon metropolitan area, Ronaldo graduated from Vitória de Guimarães' youth academy for the 2007–08 season, as the Minho club had just returned to the Primeira Liga. His competitive input with the first team consisted of two substitute appearances, against C.F. União de Lamas in the Taça de Portugal (4–2 home win) on 19 October 2008 and against S.C. Olhanense in the Taça da Liga the following 18 January (3–0 victory, also at the Estádio D. Afonso Henriques).

On 2 July 2009, Ronaldo signed with Belgium's Standard Liège on a two-year deal. The following year, without having featured in the country's Pro League, he returned to Portugal and joined Moreirense F.C. of the Segunda Liga. He made his professional league debut on 29 August 2010, playing seven minutes in a 1–0 home win over G.D. Estoril Praia.

Ronaldo continued his career in the third division in the following years, representing Juventude Sport Clube (in Évora), G.D. Tourizense and F.C. Vizela. He moved to C.D. Santa Clara in the second tier for the 2014–15 campaign, joining fellow league side Vizela two years later.

References

External links

1988 births
Living people
People from Loures
Sportspeople from Lisbon District
Portuguese footballers
Association football midfielders
Liga Portugal 2 players
Segunda Divisão players
GS Loures players
Vitória S.C. players
Moreirense F.C. players
Juventude Sport Clube players
G.D. Tourizense players
F.C. Vizela players
C.D. Santa Clara players
F.C. Penafiel players
C.D. Trofense players
Pevidém S.C. players
Standard Liège players
Portuguese expatriate footballers
Expatriate footballers in Belgium
Portuguese expatriate sportspeople in Belgium